Conjure may be:
 a verb with a range of common meanings; see its Wiktionary entry and Conjuration (disambiguation)
 a noun used regionally in the United States for Hoodoo
 the name of a 2000 poetry collection by Michael Donaghy

See also
 
 Conjurer (disambiguation)